Photosensitive glass, also known as photostructurable glass (PSG) or photomachinable glass, is a crystal-clear glass that belongs to the lithium-silicate family of glasses, in which an image of a mask  can be captured by microscopic metallic particles in the glass when it is exposed to short wave radiations such as ultraviolet light.  Photosensitive glass was first discovered by S. Donald Stookey in 1937.

History
Photosensitive glass was invented in November 1937 by Dr. Donald Stookey of the Corning Glass Works. It was announced publicly ten years later on June 1, 1947. It was patented in 1950 by Stookey as U.S. Pat. No. 2,515,937 and U.S. Pat. Nos. 2,515,943 with gold microscopic particles and marketed under the trade name PhotoCor.

Exposure process
When the glass is exposed to UV light in the wavelength range 280–320 nm, a latent image is formed. The glass remains transparent at this stage, but its absorption in the uv range of the spectrum increases. This increased absorption is only detectable using uv transmission spectroscopy.
The reason behind this is suggested to be an oxidation reduction reaction that occurs inside the glass during exposure in which cerium ions are oxidized to a more stable state and silver ions are reduced to silver.

Post-exposure heat treatment
When the glass is heated to temperatures in the range 550–560 °C for several hours the latent image is converted to a visible image through photoexcitation. Exposure through photographic negatives permits the development of three-dimensional color images and photographs.  This heat treatment is done in two stages: the temperature is first raised to about 500 °C to allow for the completion of the oxidation-reduction reaction, and formation of silver nanoclusters. In the following stage, when the temperature is raised to 550–560 °C, a new material (lithium metasilicate) with the formula (Li2SiO3) forms on the silver nanoclustors, this material forms in the crystalline phase.

HF chemical etching
The lithium metasilicate that forms in the exposed regions of the glass has the unique property of being strongly etched in hydrofluoric acid (HF). Hence allowing a three-dimensional image of the mask to be produced, the resulting glass microstructures have a surface roughness in the range 5 μm to 0.7 μm.

X-ray sensitive glasses 
As stated above radiation produces some direct and indirect measurable changes in the glasses. In some cases, the effect is readily observable immediately upon irradiation. In other cases, thermal treatment is required to bring about the observed changes. On the whole, the result of the mentioned reactions will be atomic silvers and/or silver clusters which act as nucleant for precipitation of lithium-meta-silicate during post heat-treatment of irradiated glass and  Similar to other glass-ceramic systems, the more nucleation sites leads to more reduction of crystallization temperature and finer crystalline size. Therefore, to attain the above-mentioned condition, various energetic radiation such as UVand laser beam and  x  γ  and proton  and  radiations have been used for different photosensitive glasses until now.  investigated the effect of X-ray irradiation on solarization of photosensitive lithium silicate based glasses containing cerium, antimony, tin and silver elements. They have shown that there is a possibility to use X-ray in photosensitive glasses. This will open new doors for nano machining of glasses in near future.

Applications

Photosensitive glass is used in printing and reproducing processes. Photosensitive glass is like traditional camera film except that it reacts to ultraviolet (UV) light, where camera film responds to visible light. The ideal wavelength to use for exposure should be between 300 and 350 nm, with 320 nm being optimum.

Photosensitive glass contains microscopic metallic particles. These microscopic metallic ion nanoparticles are made of gold or silver which is responsible for the refractive index change. Photosensitive glass is similar to photographic film. Photographic film uses chemicals, while photosensitive glass
uses gold or silver ions in the material that will respond to the action of light. The process is to pass light of the ultraviolet wavelength through a negative on the glass. Photographic resolution can be obtained with adhesive polyester as a reverse negative, however anything which resists UV light can act as a "negative."

The glass is sensitive to light that when passes through a mask can ultimately turn it into a permanent picture with a heat process "fixing" permanently the image. Silver glass "latent images" will develop in 3–4 hours at 886–976 °F.
Gold glass "latent images" require a higher temperature of 968–1058 °F and over a similar period of time for postbaking. Postbaking hastens the occurrence of the particles with the shadow areas of the negative, permitting deeper penetration into the glass than the highlighted areas. This gives the picture three dimensions and color.

The photograph is developed by heating the photosensitive glass around 1000 °F for several hours after exposure. The glass itself is photosensitive and produces a three-dimensional image. Particles that are invisible to the naked eye (i.e., gold or silver) are in the glass. These microscopic particles move and grow when heated to form the photographic image itself. The process is similar to camera film, however a negative is placed on top of the photosensitive glass and then exposed to ultraviolet light. Camera film, of course, would be exposed to ordinary visible light. Then there is a special process for the exposed photosensitive glass. The glass is reheated then in a kiln and postbaked for several hours. The image then appears within the special exposed glass as if by magic. The heated piece of photosensitive glass is then allowed to cool down and the process is done. The positive images produced within photosensitive  glass comes in a variety of colors.

As a material for the hot glass studio artist, an additional method of producing imagery in an object using photosensitive glass is to first blow an extremely thin rondel (cased or otherwise) which is annealed in the typical manner. That rondel is then cut into sections which are exposed under a negative.  Next, those sections (containing the latent image) are warmed and applied to the surface of a gather of hot glass on the blowpipe. As the object is completed over several furnace reheats, the heat develops the image as the object is being created. This method specifically eliminates the need for the reheating of the object in a kiln for development, which consumes considerable oven time, energy, and the risk of loss or damage due to shattering on the way up to temperature, or more importantly, slumping while being held at temperature. The timing of the glassblower determines the final degree of development, and simple choices of form minimize distortion in the image.

Since the image is inside and actually a part of the glass itself, photosensitive glass is the most durable photographic medium known. It is claimed that a photo image within photosensitive glass is the most durable form of photography and will last as long as the glass itself. The photographic image is not on the surface of the glass, but internally.

Fluorescent photosensitive glass makes it possible to make fluorescent photographs and fluorescence holography.

Photosensitive glass is different from photochromatic glass.  Photochromatic glass is used in self-darkening sunglasses which darkens when exposed to bright daylight. It then returns to see-through transparency when strong daylight is removed and can then be used indoors as regular glasses.

Little has been done to develop the product since its patent. It is labor-intensive and has a high cost. Only large commercial glass factories produce it. In the 1980s photosensitive glass was created to a small degree to be used in "hot glass" work. Then individual artists owned smaller studios and created works in blown glass and began experimenting with photosensitive glass. Going into the Twenty-First Century only a few glass artists know the technique of achieving good results with photosensitive glass.
In the present time, the only photosensitive glasses produced are PhotoCor(R), Foturan and APEX. PhotoCor is produced by the inventor, Corning, Inc. Foturan is produced by Schott Corporation and Apex by Life Bioscience. Photosensitive glass has been used as a holographic material to record diffractive optical elements for high power laser applications.

Military applications
One of the reasons for the delay between the invention of photosensitive glass and its public announcement approximately ten years later was its potential use in military applications. It is possible to burn images and words that are hidden in photosensitive glass until heated at a high temperature.  The military used this fact during World War II to send secret messages to allied troops in pieces of what looked like "ordinary glass".  At the other end, the person who received the "ordinary glass" just had to heat it up to read the hidden message. Because of this application photosensitive glass was kept secret until the end of World War II.

Building applications
The United Nations Building was faced with hundreds of square feet of photosensitive glass until its 2007 refurbishment when it was replaced with conventional glass with a printed pattern

See also
 Photochromic lens

References

Bibliography
 Encyclopædia Britannica, The New Encyclopædia Britannica, v.8 Macropaedia Ge-Hu, Encyclopædia Britannica, 1974, 
 Parker, Sybil P., Dictionary of Scientific and Technical Terms. McGraw-Hill Companies, Inc., (2003) - "photosensitive glass," ,
 Maluf, Nadim et al., Introduction to Microelectromechanical Systems Engineering, Artech House, 2004, 
 Paul, Amal, Chemistry of Glasses, Springer, 1990, 
 Stookey,  S. Donald, Journey to the Center of the Crystal Ball : An Autobiography, American Ceramic Society (1985), 
 Stookey,  S. Donald, Explorations in Glass: An Autobiography, Wiley-Blackwell (2000),

External links

Glass chemistry
Photography equipment
Ceramic materials
American inventions